Helen Vita (7 August 1928 in Hohenschwangau – 16 February 2001 in Berlin) was a Swiss chanson singer, actress, and comedian. In 1966 Vita recorded Freche Chansons aus dem alten Frankreich, traditional French chansons translated into German. The explicit content of the songs was under scrutiny by courts in Germany before the Protests of 1968. She was married to the composer Walter Baumgartner.

Filmography

References

External links
 
 

1928 births
2001 deaths
Swiss film actresses
20th-century Swiss women singers
20th-century Swiss actresses
People from Ostallgäu